Laolu (Olaolu) Senbanjo, also known as "Laolu NYC", is a Nigerian visual artist, musician, singer/songwriter, and former human rights attorney.

Early life 
Senbanjo was born and raised in Ilorin, Nigeria by Yoruba parents. His father was a lawyer, his mother was a nurse. He grew up performing in his church's choir. While in school he had a music group called Light and Fire which performed original songs and covers.

Senbanjo studied law at Nigeria's Law School and, despite wanting to drop out during his second year, received his degree in 2005. He then worked as a human rights lawyer for five years, spending his final three years working at the National Human Rights Commission as a senior legal officer focusing on women and children's rights. Senbanjo travelled to different parts of Northern Nigeria visiting schools and villages to educate men and women about why children should be in school.

"I knew if I pursued a career in the arts, I'd have to live with the fact that some people in my hometown might never talk to me again", said Senbanjo in an interview with 99U. Despite this, in 2010 Senbanjo quit his job as a lawyer and started the Laolu Senbanjo Art Gallery in Abuja, Nigeria.

Senbanjo moved to Brooklyn, New York, in August 2013 to pursue his art career.

Visual art 

Senbanjo has coined his style of art, Afromysterics, meaning mystery of the African thought pattern. It incorporates African themes and African traditions. His uses charcoal and distinct patterns to create complex, story-rich art designs that draw heavily on his Yoruba heritage and feature ancient Nigerian symbols and patterns. Senbanjo says his Nigerian roots are a major source for his visual inspiration. Though his visual references have been described as sharing "affinities with Jean-Michel Basquiat and Keith Haring".

He has had commissions from, and formed partnerships with, celebrities and brand titans including Nike, Beyoncé's album Lemonade, the Grammy Museum, and the Smithsonian Institution. He has also partnered with Danielle Brooks (who plays Tasha Jefferson on the Netflix series Orange Is the New Black). In June 2015, Senbanjo's new mantra became "everything is my canvas" and he began painting on everything from shoes, to jackets, to people. He created the Sacred Art of the Ori Ritual, which he describes and explains in an 11 September 2017 TED talk. In his TED talk, Senbanjo talks about his work Dreamscape. In Laolu Senbanjo’s 2018 print, Dreamscape, he reflects his frustration with the injustice in the world. Working as a human rights attorney, he saw cases with children who faced the harsh reality of getting forced into marriage or continuing their education at a university. The artwork “is a mind map,” starting where most life does, from a vagina, to then connecting the journey of life and all that comes with that experience to the origin story of being born. Some of the print’s “major themes include religion, war, politics, technology, Egyptology, sexuality, economics, environmental waste, media, history, music, greed and human nature.” Like most of his art, a bold design connects each element in the work inspired by his Yoruba ancestry. Another example of his art style and ancestral Yoruba influence that is more well-known is showcased in Beyoncé’s Lemonade, where Senbanjo’s body art is showcase throughout the visual album.

Selected exhibitions and talks 

 December 2014: Three shows at Art Basel Miami.
 May 2016: His exhibit "Sounds of Africa" opens at the Grammy Museum in Los Angeles, CA in collaboration with BET.
 September 2016: Laolu performs " Creation as a Ritual: Performing Disguise", a live art installation featuring three dancers and live musicians, at the Brooklyn Museum.

Art appearances in selected music videos 
Senbanjo and his Sacred Art of the Ori Ritual has been featured in various music videos, including:
 April 2015: "Come with me."  by South African Black Coffee (DJ)
 April 2016: Sorry (Beyoncé song) from Beyonce's Visual Album, Lemonade
 September 2017: "Big Bad Soca"  by Bunji Garlin
 February 2018: "Catch Your Eye"  by Jussie Smollett ft Swizz Beatz
 October 2019: "LA CANCIÓN"  by J Balvin x Bad Bunny

Brand collaborations 
Senbanjo has been invited to collaborate with several brands, including:
 Nike invites Senbanjo to become a Master of Air and create a T-shirt and sneaker design for Nike Air Max 2016,  for sneaker enthusiasts.
 October 2016: Shoe designer Kenneth Cole and Laolu collaborate on a #MyStepsWill advertising campaign.
 BVLGARI Man in Black Essence limited edition Cologne bottle
 Limited-edition packaging for Starbucks Espresso Roast, also available as a ceramic double-wall tumbler, 2018
 Belvedere Vodka Limited-edition bottle, 2018
 NYC Fashion week
 Apple Inc., 2019
 Target Corporation, 2019
 Essence (magazine) cover with Serena Williams, 2019 
 Facebook Lift Black Voices Artwork, 2020
 Instagram
 Barclays Center

Music 
Senbanjo is a world music artist who draws influences from Fela Kuti, Sade (singer), Bob Marley, and King Sunny Adé. His musical style is deeply rooted in the traditions of Afrobeat and High Life, mixed with Afro-Soul and Reggae. Senbanjo blends singing in his native Yoruba language and often translates Yoruba folks songs, proverbs and his oriki into English.

Select music appearances 
 September 2014: Senbanjo opened for Tony Allen (musician) (the creator of Afrobeat) at SOB's in New York City, NY with his band Laolu and the Afromysterics.
 March 2015: Laolu and the Afromysterics performed at South by Southwest in Austin, Texas.

See also 
 Performance art

References

External links 
 
 



Living people
21st-century Nigerian artists
21st-century Nigerian musicians
Nigerian emigrants to the United States
Nigerian artists
21st-century Nigerian lawyers
People from Ilorin
Performance artists
Yoruba artists
Yoruba legal professionals
Yoruba musicians
1982 births